Lesya Yuriyivna Orobets (born May 3, 1982) is a Ukrainian politician and a Member of the Verkhovna Rada of Ukraine (Parliament of Ukraine) since 2007 (elected as member of Our Ukraine - People's Self-Defence), and was re-elected in 2012 (as member of Batkivshchyna).

Education 
From 1996 to 1999, Orobets attended the Ukrainian Humanitarian Lyceum at Taras Shevchenko National University of Kyiv where she specialized in law. After graduating, Orobets continued on to study at the Institute for International Relations at Taras Shevchenko National University of Kyiv from 1999 to 2005. She graduated with a Master's Degree in international law and a specialization in English translation.

Professional experience and political career

From January 2002 to March 2004, Orobets was a lawyer at the law firm "Сота" LTD in Kyiv, Ukraine. Then beginning in March 2004, she worked as an assistant-consultant to People's Deputy of Ukraine (Member of Parliament), Yuriy Orobets until September 2004. Starting in October 2004 and lasting until October 2005, Orobets served as a legal assistant in the International Finance Corporation of the World Bank in Kyiv. Immediately following this experience, Orobets worked as an employee representative of the law firm Baker & McKenzie located in Kyiv and remained there until February 2007.

In September 2007, Orobets was elected as a People's Deputy of Ukraine of the 6th convocation of the Verkhovna Rada of Ukraine (Parliament of Ukraine) as a part of the Our Ukraine - People's Self-Defence as a non-party candidate. Orobets also served as a member of the Committee on Education and Science, and was the head of the subcommittee on basic education.

In 2008, Orobets joined the political party United Centre where she remained until November 13, 2010 when, in a sign of protest against the ascension of the United Centre party leader Viktor Baloha into Prime Minister Mykola Azarov's government, Orobets left the party and accused its leaders of betraying the interests of its voters.

Since 2011 and by June 2013, Orobets was a member of the political party Front for Change.

Elected during the 2012 Ukrainian parliamentary election, since December 2012, Orobets serves as a Deputy of the 7th convocation of Parliament as a part of Batkivshchyna, she is also currently the Secretary of the Committee on Foreign Affairs.

In June 2013 there was a merger of Front for Change and Batkivshchyna.

Early March 2014 she became a candidate for Mayor of Kyiv in the 2014 Kyiv local election (including Mayoral elections) set for 25 May 2014. Orobets withdrew herself from Batkivshchyna on 31 March 2014 to be a candidate for Mayor with a "non-party status". But during these elections she headed the New Life party list. In the mayoral elections she finished second (after Vitali Klitschko who won with almost 57% of the votes) with 8.46%. She was elected into the Kyiv City Council since her party won 3 seats. But Orobets decided not to become a deputy in the Kyiv City Council. Then Orobets created the new party Mighty Ukraine that was registered at the Ukrainian Ministry of Justice on 27 July 2014.

Orobets did not take part in the 2014 Ukrainian parliamentary election; citing health reasons.

Civic and political activism 
Starting in 2004, Orobets has actively participated in preparations for Ukrainian presidential elections.

According to analysts, Orobets may claim a record in the number of parliamentary appeals she has addressed to executive authorities at different levels of the government. Between 2011-2013 alone, Orobets sent over 800 appeals to government officials, which focused primarily on protecting the rights of citizens and combating corruption during various important procedures. Working on the issue of corruption in collaboration with «Nashi Groshi» and «Anticorruption Action Center», Orobets helped save about 1 billion UAH (or about $100 million) from procurement in the form of budget costs in 2012. Orobets is one of the founders of the national center of the Global Organization of Parliamentarians Against Corruption (GOPAC).

Orobets publicly appealed to President Viktor Yushchenko in 2008 with a request to stop the theft of land by individuals close to the government, and alongside Bohdan Hubsky she initiated the creation of a temporary inquiry committee to study the circumstances of land purchases in Kyiv Oblast.

In 2010, Orobets mobilized citizens from Shulyavka and Solom'yanka (Kyiv districts) to protect the clean environment of Kyiv by attempting to put a stop to the construction of a waste incineration factory in a densely populated area in the capital, which was going to be built despite its illegality. This mobilization of citizens forced the government to make a decision relating to the closure of the factory.

Since 2010, she has also fought to prevent the formation of a rigid vertical system of administration in the field of science and education as well as Dmytro Tabachnyk's intended course of politicization of the field of science and education in the interests of the Party of Regions.

From 2010 to 2012, Orobets actively protested against attempts to falsify committee rulings and regulations. Orobets publicly turned to Volodymyr Lytvyn in 2011 with a request to renew the text of the law on banning tobacco advertisement, which was falsified before being given to the head of the Verkhovna Rada to sign.

During the parliamentarian elections in 2012, Orobets defended the will of citizens of Cherkasy from falsification in district 194.

One of her priorities as a Secretary of the Committee on Foreign Affairs is that Ukraine signs an Association Agreement with the EU.

Legislative initiatives 
Her legislative priorities include the reform of primary, secondary and higher education, transparent and effective system of elections for units of representative government, and encouragement of charitable activities and leading a healthy lifestyle.

During her term in the 6th convocation of the Verkhovna Rada, Orobets prepared 35 regulatory propositions which included propositions on the reform of Ukraine's higher education system, standardization of independent evaluations as the single criteria for acceptance into universities, the increase of the right of individuals to basic education, a crucial proposition on the regulation of charitable organizations, and, alongside experts, the development of international charity funds. Of these, eight regulations, are already in effect. These regulations include, "On public associations", "On the introduction of a moratorium on the closure of secondary schools in rural areas", "On amendments to certain legislative acts of Ukraine to ban advertisements, sponsorships and promotion of sale of tobacco products", "On amendments to certain legislative acts of Ukraine to pass laws to restrict tobacco product smoking spaces" and more.

Experts highlight the high effectiveness of Orobets' regulatory innovations in the sphere of corruption prevention and smoking reform aimed at the ban of tobacco product advertisement (first and second legislation), increasing the tobacco excise tax and banning smoking in public places (first and second legislation). As a result of these regulatory innovations, the level of smoking in Ukraine over the last five years has decreased 17% among men and double that figure among women. In fact, due to the introduction of the excise tax, in only nine months (January 2012 – September 2012) the Ukrainian budget received 12.8 billion UAH. Moreover, since September 16, 2012 all tobacco product advertisements have been banned in Ukraine. As of December 16, 2012, there has been a complete ban on smoking in all food service locations.

Orobets is also actively struggling to solve the problems of Ukrainian orphans, specifically through the ratification of international agreements in this field.

Family 

Orobets' father was Yuriy Mykolayovych Orobets, a Ukrainian politician and People's Deputy of Ukraine from 1994 to 1998 and 2002 to 2006. President Viktor Yushchenko awarded Yuriy Orobets the Hero of Ukraine award posthumously in 2007. During the 2004 mayoral elections in Mukachevo, Yuriy Orobets actively struggled against the use of administrative resources and election fraud. He died in a car accident under suspicious circumstances before a special inquiry commission released a report about unlawful elections in Cherkasy. 
Lesya Orobets' mother is Oksana, a chemical engineer and pensioner.

Orobets is married to Oleksandr Omelchuk and has two daughters – Sofiya (16 December 2008) and Erika (25 August 2010). Omelchuk is Chairman of Phoenix Capital, a Ukraine-based investment bank.

In November 2012, a few weeks after the 2012 parliamentary elections, Omelchuk landed in the center of media attention in relation to allegations of tax evasion and the Phoenix Capital office was searched on 13 November. This was seen by Orobets herself as a way of pressuring her into a pro-Presidential (Viktor Yanukovych) majority in the Verkhovna Rada and an attempt to monopolize the entire investment sector to "the people close to power". (According to Orobets) due to increasing political pressure, Omelchuk was forced to flee the country in June 2013. She added that she was receiving anonymous phone threats. Late June 2013 the leaders of the three opposition political groups - Arseniy Yatsenyuk, Vitaliy Klychko and Oleh Tyahnybok - along with over one hundred other MPs signed a claim to stop the politically motivated persecution of opposition MPs and members of their families.

Cultural and political image
According to the newspaper DELO (2010), Orobets was selected as the most influential politician-blogger of 2010. Additionally, the magazine Focus named Orobets one of the 100 most influential women in Ukraine – ranking her 54th in 2011 and 26th in 2012. Finally, the journal "Public People" (2011) stated that Orobets is amongst the 10 most influential figures in the field of education in Ukraine.

In connection with statements and active participation in human rights projects, Orobets has from time to time landed in the middle of the media's attention.

On May 3, 2014, she caused controversy when she posted pictures of herself posing with a rifle on Facebook and Twitter, just the day after the deadly Odessa clashes, which she characterized as "a great victory" and "an adequate response" to the pro-Russian demonstrations.

References

External links

1982 births
Living people
Politicians from Kyiv
United Centre politicians
Front for Change (Ukraine) politicians
All-Ukrainian Union "Fatherland" politicians
Sixth convocation members of the Verkhovna Rada
Seventh convocation members of the Verkhovna Rada
People of the Euromaidan
21st-century Ukrainian women politicians
21st-century Ukrainian lawyers
World Bank Group people
Taras Shevchenko National University of Kyiv alumni
Ukrainian women lawyers
21st-century women lawyers
Women members of the Verkhovna Rada